The Compaq Presario R3000 Line is a Series of laptops designed and built by Hewlett-Packard Corporation. They originally shipped with Microsoft Windows XP but could be configured with 98, 2000, or ME. The series used Intel or AMD Processors, could be ordered with 128 MB (128 MiB) up to 1 GB of RAM (with some being reserved for graphical memory), and could come with an ATI Mobility Radeon 9000/9100 or Nvidia GeForce 4 integrated graphics chip. The integrated sound card was made by Analog Devices and outputs to JBL Pro speakers that sit above the keyboard. 

Certain configurations included an integrated Broadcom 54G wireless networking card. Connection ports include USB, Firewire, 3.5 mm audio output, 3.5 mm audio input, s-video output, VGA output, and parallel. One port that is special to this series is an Expansion Port for HP's Expansion Dock that allows an extra array of ports when the laptop is docked. Several optical media options were available including a standard DVD read-only drive up to a DVD+RW/CD-RW drive at varying speeds. The computer is encased in a black and silver plastic shell, weighs about ten pounds, and has two cooling fans, both mounted under the keyboard.

References 

Presario R3000